Kitchen towel can refer to:

 Dishtowel in North American English, called tea towel in UK English
 Paper towel in UK English